The International Child Art Foundation is a nonprofit organization founded in 1997 to cultivate creativity and grow mutual empathy—valuable antidotes to many of the struggles our world faces today. ICAF serves American children as their national arts organization and the world’s children as their global arts organization.

History
Inspired by E. Paul Torrance's longitudinal and cross-cultural studies of the "4th Grade Slump", Dr. Ashfaq Ishaq founded ICAF to help children overcome this slump so that it does not linger into adulthood. On its own, creativity is morally neutral—it can have positive or negative purposes or consequences. It is dangerous to think otherwise. For positive creativity, the development of empathy is essential. Consequently, ICAF fosters creativity and empathy as key attributes of successful learners and leaders.

Since 1999 the ICAF has produced the World Children's Festival every four years on The National Mall in Washington, D.C. to honor the Arts Olympiad winners at an event of children's co-learning and co-creation.

Arts Olympiad

The ICAF's flagship program is the Arts Olympiad. This art and sport program for children ages 8 to 12 is the most prestigious and largest in the world. The Arts Olympiad winners represent their cities at the World Children's Festival at the National Mall in Washington, DC.  The next World Children's Festival will be held in the Summer of 2021.

Peace Through Art Programs
The Peace Through Art Programs tap into the creativity of children so they can visualize with the importance of peace and co-existence. Their goal is to reduce the transmission of trauma and hatred from the current generation to the future one. The program develops empathy through art and imparts leadership skills so children can co-create a peaceful future for their communities. The program also aims to repair trust in humanity of children living in conflict zones.

Healing Arts Programs
The Healing Arts Programs was started in response to the Asian tsunami of December 2004. The organization wanted to transfer the knowledge and experience gained from the treatment of the child survivors of the 9/11 attacks to help the tsunami child survivors. The Tsunami Healing Arts Program was extended to the U.S. Gulf Coast as Katrina Healing Arts Program after Hurricane Katrina.The ICAF partnered with the World Bank Arts Program in 2005 on its "Destruction, Reconstruction and Prevention" program to broaden the understanding of natural disasters in the international development community.

Accomplishments

 Approximately 5 million children in 80 countries have produced art under the ICAF programs.
 The ICAF has the distinction of having hosted the first national children's art festival in U.S. history, which took place in Washington D.C. in September 1998.
 The Congressional Arts Caucus has endorsed the Arts Olympiad for "its important national and international implications" while the U.S. Olympic Committee has granted the ICAF a license to use the "Arts Olympiad" mark.

References

Children's arts organizations
Arts organizations established in 1997